Henry O'Brien may refer to:

 Henry O'Brien, Lord Ibrackan (c. 1642–1678), Irish nobleman and politician
 Henry O'Brien, 5th Earl of Thomond (1588–1639), Irish peer
 Henry O'Brien, 7th Earl of Thomond (c. 1620–1691), Irish peer
 Henry O'Brien, 8th Earl of Thomond (1688–1741), Irish peer and Member of Parliament
 Henry O'Brien (Australian politician) (1793–1866), Irish-born New South Wales politician
 Henry O'Brien (classicist) (1808–1835), Irish classicist and author
 Henry O'Brien (colonel) (died 1863), colonel of the 11th New York Volunteer Infantry Regiment killed during the New York draft riots
 Henry O'Brien (cyclist) (1910–1973), American cyclist
 Henry D. O'Brien (1842–-1902), Medal of Honor recipient from the American Civil War
 Henry Joseph O'Brien (1896–1976), American prelate of the Roman Catholic Church
 Henry L. O'Brien (c. 1869–1935), American politician from New York
 Henry X. O'Brien (c. 1903–1990), American lawyer and judge